In Ancient Greek religion and mythology, the Erotes are a collective of winged gods associated with love and sexual intercourse. They are part of Aphrodite's retinue. Erotes (Greek ) is the plural of Eros ("Love, Desire"), who as a singular deity has a more complex mythology.

Other named Erotes are Anteros ("Love Returned"), Hedylogos ("Sweet-talk"), Hermaphroditus ("Hermaphrodite" or "Effeminate"), Himeros ("Impetuous Love" or "Pressing Desire"), Hymenaios ("Bridal-Hymn"), and Pothos ("Desire, Longing", especially for one who is absent).

The Erotes became a motif of Hellenistic art, and may appear in Roman art in the alternate form of multiple Cupids or Cupids and Psyches. In the later tradition of Western art, Erotes become indistinguishable from figures also known as Cupids, amorini, or amoretti.

General role and attributes
The Erotes are a group of winged gods in Classical mythology. They are associated with love and sexual desire, and form part of Aphrodite's retinue. The individual Erotes are sometimes linked to particular aspects of love, and are often associated with same-sex desire. Sometimes the Erotes are regarded as manifestations of a singular god, Eros.

Stories of the Erotes' mischief or pranks were a popular theme in Hellenistic culture, particularly in the 2nd century BCE. Spells to attract or repel Erotes were used, in order to induce love or the opposite. Different Erotes represented various facets of love or desire, such as unrequited love (Himeros), mutual love (Anteros) or longing (Pothos).

The Erotes were usually portrayed as nude, handsome, winged youths. The earliest known sculptured friezes depicting a group of Erotes and winged maidens driving chariots pulled by goats, were created to decorate theatres in ancient Greece in the 2nd century BCE. The representation of Erotes in such friezes became common, including Erotes in hunting scenes. Due to their role in the classical mythological pantheon, the Erotes' representation is sometimes purely symbolic (indicating some form of love) or they may be portrayed as individual characters. The presence of Erotes in otherwise non-sexual images, such as of two women, has been interpreted to indicate a homoerotic subtext. In the cult of Aphrodite in Anatolia, iconographic images of the goddess with three Erotes symbolized the three realms over which she had dominion: the Earth, sky, and water.

Retinue members
Groups of numerous Erotes are portrayed in ancient Greek and Roman art. In addition, a number of named gods have been regarded as Erotes, sometimes being assigned particular associations with aspects of love.

Anteros

Anteros (Greek: Ἀντέρως, Antérōs) was the god of requited love, literally "love returned" or "counterpart love".  He punished those who scorned love and the advances of others, and was the avenger of unrequited love. Anteros was the son of Ares and Aphrodite in Greek mythology, and given to his brother Eros as a playmate because Eros was lonely. In another version, Anteros arose from mutual feelings between Poseidon and Nerites. Physically, Anteros was depicted as similar to Eros in every way, though sometimes with longer hair and butterfly wings.  He has been described as armed with either a golden club or arrows of lead.

Eros

Eros was the original, primordial god of love and intercourse; he was also worshiped as a fertility deity. His Roman counterpart was Cupid (desire).

In later myths, he was the son of the deities Aphrodite and Ares: It is the Eros of these later myths who is one of the erotes. Eros was associated with athleticism, with statues erected in gymnasia, and "was often regarded as the protector of homosexual love between men." Eros was depicted as often carrying a lyre or bow and arrow. He was also depicted accompanied by dolphins, flutes, roosters, roses, and torches.

Hedylogos

Hedylogos or Hedylogus was the god of sweet-talk and flattery. He is not mentioned in any existing literature, but he is depicted on ancient Greek vase paintings.

Hermaphroditus

Hermaphroditus was the god of hermaphrodites, effeminacy and androgyny. He was the son of Hermes and Aphrodite. Born a remarkably handsome boy but after the water nymph Salmacis fell in love with him and she prayed to be united forever, their two forms merged into one.

Himeros
Himeros (Greek:  "uncontrollable desire", Latin: Himerus) represented desire and unrequited love. Himeros was identified by his carrying a taenia, a colourful headband worn by athletes. He is described in Hesiod's Theogony as being born alongside Aphrodite.

Hymenaeus / Hymen

Hymenaeus or Hymen was the god of weddings and marriage.

Pothos
Pothos (Greek: , "yearning", "desire") was one of Aphrodite's erotes and brother to Himeros and Eros. In some versions of myth, Pothos is the son of Eros, or is portrayed as an independent aspect of him. Yet others called him son of Zephyrus and Iris. He was part of Aphrodite's retinue, and carried a vine, indicating a connection to wine or the god Dionysus. Pothos represents longing or yearning.
 In the temple of Aphrodite at Megara, there was a sculpture that represented Pothos together with Eros and Himeros which has been credited to Scopas. Pothos is a name for the white Asphodelus albus flower, "used at funerals".

Phthonus

Sometime counted among the Erotes or at least among Aphrodite's retinue, Phthonus was the personification of jealousy and envy, most prominently in matters of romance.

See also
Cupid
List of love and lust deities
LGBT themes in mythology
Harmonia

References

External links

 
 

 
Love and lust gods
Homosexuality and bisexuality deities
Greek love and lust deities
Greek gods
Children of Aphrodite
Sexuality in ancient Rome
Avian humanoids
LGBT themes in Greek mythology
Sexuality in ancient Greece
Nudity in mythology
Children of Ares
Personifications in Greek mythology
Olympian deities